Elm Hall Wildlife Management Area is a 2,839 acre protected area in Assumption Parish Louisiana. The WMA is located five miles west of Napoleonville, with Lake Verret on the western border (as well as the Belle River), farmland to the east, and is managed by the Louisiana Department of Wildlife and Fisheries (LDWF).

Description
Elm Hall WMA is a naturally flooded cypress-tupelo swamp that rises slightly to the east and is within the Atchafalaya Basin. Bald eagles nest in the cypress trees surrounding Lake Verret.

Access
Access to the WMA is by boat only and boat launches are available at Attakapas Landing, at the end of LA 401, Pierre Part, Louisiana on Louisiana Highway 70 (LA 70), and at the end of LA 402.

Health Concerns 
A study supported by a United States National Science Foundation grant (EAR-1014946 and EAR-1148005) found there is a high concentration of Arsenic in tested groundwater wells in the area of Napoleonville. 

A March 15, 2016 sampling of parish supplied water from Bayou Lafourche showed 1.2 parts per billion (ppb) presence of Arsenic. A 2010 USGS fact sheet Water Resources of Assumption Parish, Louisiana did not contain Arsenic information.

A 2016 study by Karen H. Johannesson found Arsenic levels at two sites, Bayou Lafourche near Napoleonville and Cow Island in Vermillion Parish, to be "10 times higher than EPA standards of less than 10 parts per billion."

Oilfield canals
There are extensive oilfield canals on the WMA such as Godchaux canal, Talbot Canal, and several others as well as an oilfield tank battery.

See also
List of Louisiana Wildlife Management Areas

References

Wildlife management areas of the United States
Protected areas of Louisiana
Geography of Assumption Parish, Louisiana
Wildlife management areas of Louisiana